Salix purpurea, the purple willow, purpleosier willow, or purple osier, is a species of willow native to most of Europe and western Asia north to the British Isles, Poland, and the Baltic States.

It is a deciduous shrub growing to 1–3 m (rarely to 5 m) tall, with purple-brown to yellow-brown shoots, turning pale grey on old stems. The leaves are 2–8 cm (rarely to 12 cm) long and 0.3–1 cm (rarely 2 cm) wide; they are dark green above, glaucous green below, and unusually for a willow, are often arranged in opposite pairs rather than alternate. The flowers are small catkins 1.5-4.5 cm long, produced in early spring; they are often purple or red in colour, whence the name of the species (other willows mostly have whitish, yellow or green catkins).

It is replaced further east in Asia by the closely related species Salix sinopurpurea (syn. S. purpurea var. longipetiolatea).

The weeping cultivar ‘Pendula‘ has gained the Royal Horticultural Society’s Award of Garden Merit. As with several other willows, the shoots, called withies, are often used in basketry. The wood of this and other willow species is used in making cricket bats.

References

External links
 
 
 

purpurea
Medicinal plants
Flora of Ukraine
Plants described in 1753
Taxa named by Carl Linnaeus